Troitske is a village in Yasynuvata Raion (district) in Donetsk Oblast of eastern Ukraine, at 31.1 km NNE from the centre of Donetsk city. On May 14, 2022, the Donetsk People's Republic militia's 1st mechanised battalion took control over the village from the Ukrainian Armed Forces.

Demographics
In 2001 the settlement had 239 inhabitants. As of the Ukrainian Census of 2001, Ukrainian is the native language of 87.03% of the population and Russian the native language of 12.55% of the population.

References

External links
 Weather forecast for Troitske

Villages in Pokrovsk Raion